Gosho Park is a conservation area of approximately  of land on the Springvale Estate (it is adjacent to Peterhouse Girls' School and Springvale House), situated in Mashonaland East, Zimbabwe. The park, named after Patrick Gosho and owned by the Peterhouse Group of Schools, is enclosed by a  game fence. The park is an area of Brachystegia woodland with two streams, their associated grasslands and rocky outcrops (some with Bushmen paintings). 237 species of birds have been recorded by the Mashonaland East Birding Group with a variety of Brachystegia species such as the spotted creeper, miombo and rufous-bellied tits. There are 72 species of trees in the area as recorded by the Tree Society.

History
In 1984 Peter Ginn, the well known bird photographer and Geography teacher at Peterhouse Boys' School, approached The United Bottling Company, Mr Daryl Mitchell from Rakodzi farm and several others and a fence was erected. The park comprises land from Rakodzi farm and Springvale Estate. Later on in 1984, a pond was built and some game (nine impalas and several sables) was introduced. It was named after Patrick Gosho, a former Estate Manager at Springvale House with a history of running the Springvale Estate and being Springvale School's first employee.

During the 1980s builders and groups of schoolboys at Peterhouse worked to create roads, trails, picnic sites, the Bush Camp and other facilities. More game was introduced over the years.

See also

 Calderwood Park
 Peterhouse Group of Schools
It was rumoured among the indigenous African Peterhouse Cohort of the late 1980s that Mr Gosho was in fact the rightful owner of the land that now constitutes Gosho Park.

References

External links
 Gosho Park on the Peterhouse website
 Gosho Park on MyDestination website

Protected areas of Zimbabwe
Parks in Zimbabwe
Geography of Mashonaland East Province
Tourist attractions in Mashonaland East Province
Protected areas established in 1984
1984 establishments in Zimbabwe